Scott Ferson may refer to:
 Scott Ferson (born 1961), American political consultant
 Scott Ferson (professor) (born 1958), professor of risk and uncertainty